Banksia armata var. ignicida is a variety of shrub that is endemic to Western Australia. It differs from the autonym (Banksia armata var. armata) in not having a lignotuber. It is also usually a taller plant with leaves that are longer with fewer side lobes, and longer flowers.

Description

Taxonomy
Specimens of B. armata were first collected in 1801, and the description was published in 1810 in the Transactions of the Linnean Society of London by Robert Brown as Dryandra armata. In 1996, Alex George described two varieties of D. armata in the journal Nuytsia. The type specimens of D. armata var. ignicida were collected by him east of Woodanilling. In 2007, all Dryandra species were transferred to Banksia by Austin Mast and Kevin Thiele and the change is accepted by the Australian Plant Census.

Distribution and habitat
This variety occurs through much of the south-west of Western Australia, being widespread between Pingelly and Katanning, and east to Mount Ragged in the Cape Arid National Park.

References

armata var. ignicida
Endemic flora of Western Australia
Taxa named by Kevin Thiele